Footsteps in the Dark: Greatest Hits Vol. 2 is a compilation album released by Cat Stevens in 1982. Its fourteen songs include hits such as "Father and Son" and "Where Do the Children Play?" as well as two previously unreleased tracks from the Hal Ashby and Colin Higgins black comedy Harold and Maude (1971), and the obscure B-side "I Want to Live in a Wigwam" from the Teaser sessions.

Track listing
All songs written by Cat Stevens, except where noted.

"The Wind" – 1:42
"(I Never Wanted) To Be a Star" – 3:00
"Katmandu" – 3:20
"I Want to Live in a Wigwam" – 3:23
"Trouble" – 2:45
"On the Road to Find Out" – 5:08
"If You Want to Sing Out, Sing Out" – 2:46
"Where Do the Children Play?" – 3:52
"Daytime" (Cat Stevens, Alun Davies) – 3:55
"Don't Be Shy" – 2:50
"How Can I Tell You" – 4:26
"Father & Son" – 3:40
"The Hurt" – 4:17
"Silent Sunlight" – 2:59

Charts

Year-end charts

Certifications

References

1982 greatest hits albums
Cat Stevens compilation albums
Albums produced by Paul Samwell-Smith
A&M Records compilation albums